Duchesne is a surname. Notable people with the surname include:

Joseph Duchesne (c. 1544–1609), French physician and chemist. Physician-in-ordinary to King Henry IV 
André Duchesne (1584–1640), French historian
François Duchesne (1616–1693), French historian, son of André
Antoine Nicolas Duchesne (1747–1827) French botanist and strawberry breeder
Rose Philippine Duchesne (1769–1852), Catholic nun and French saint
Henri Gabriel Duchesne (1793–1822), French naturalist
Abbé Louis Duchesne (1843–1922), French priest, philologist, teacher and church historian
Ernest Duchesne (1874–1912), French physician
Roger Duchesne (1906–1996), French film actor
André Duchesne (musician) (1949–), Canadian musician
Christiane Duchesne (1949–), Canadian researcher, educator, illustrator, translator and writer
Ricardo Duchesne, Canadian historical sociologist
Gaétan Duchesne (1962–2007), French ice hockey player
Steve Duchesne (1965–), French ice hockey player

See also
Duchêne (disambiguation)
Duchesne County, Utah
Duchesne, Utah a town located there
Duchesne River, namesake of the town and county
Fort Duchesne, Utah
Duchesne Academy of the Sacred Heart (Houston, Texas), Houston, Texas
Duchesne Academy of the Sacred Heart (Omaha, Nebraska), Omaha, Nebraska
Le Père Duchesne, French newspaper, and its editor Jacques Hébert (1757–1794)
Le Père Duchesne (19th century), a later newspaper